The Huancabamba River ("Stony Plain" in the Quechua language) in the Pasco Region of Peru has its origin in the confluence of several small rivers near the town of Oxapampa: the Chontabamba, the Llamaquizú, and the Esperanza rivers. In its lower course the Pozuzó is called the Pachitea River which joins the Ucayali River, a major component in the Amazon River drainage basin.

A few kilometres of the river above Pozuzo is within the Yanachaga–Chemillén National Park. The river is located in the ecological zone of the Peruvian Yungas, or Ceja de Selva ("eyebrow of the jungle"), the transition zone between the low jungles of the Amazon Basin and the Andes highlands.

The narrow valley of the Huancabamba was first settled by Europeans in the 19th century by colonists from Austria and Germany. The area retains traces of Germanic culture and architecture. Prior to the arrival of the Europeans the Huancabamba area was inhabited by the Yanesha (Amuesa) people.

Footnotes

Rivers of Peru
Rivers of Pasco Region